City Cemetery or Old City Cemetery may refer to:

 City Cemetery (Raleigh, North Carolina), NRHP-listed
 City Cemetery (San Francisco, California), defunct cemetery active from 1870 to 1909
 City Cemetery (Sandersville, Georgia), NRHP-listed
 Der Stadt Friedhof, aka City Cemetery (Fredericksburg, Texas)
 Oakwood Cemetery (Austin, Texas), aka City Cemetery, listed on the NRHP in Texas
 Old City Cemetery (Columbus, Georgia), listed on the National Register of Historic Places (NRHP)
 Old City Cemetery (Lynchburg, Virginia), listed on the NRHP in Virginia
 Old City Cemetery (Macon, Georgia), a historic district contributing property
 Sacramento Historic City Cemetery, aka Old City Cemetery, listed on the NRHP in California